The Blind Sunflowers is a 2008 Spanish film directed by José Luis Cuerda and written by Rafael Azcona and Cuerda, based on the 2004 novel The Blind Sunflowers by Alberto Méndez. The film stars Maribel Verdú, Javier Cámara and Raúl Arévalo.

This film was Spain's 81st Academy Awards official submission to Foreign Language Film category, but it was not selected.

Plot 
The plot follows the life of a family, former sympathizers of the Spanish Republic, during the early 1940s. Their lives are disrupted when a young priest falls in love with the mother. The film is set in Ourense, 1940 where a disorientated deacon, named Salvador returns to the seminary of Ourense where the Rector delays Salvador's access to priesthood for a year. Salvador begins teaching in a school where he meets with Lorenzo, the son of Elena, whom of which Salvador thinks is widowed. This opportunity multiplies with the deacon becoming obsessed with her, abusing her mentally and physically. We realise that Salvador is threatening Elena's family because of his obsession. Wounded and beaten by the circumstances, the characters of the Blind Sunflowers hit the wall of repression, impossible romances and emotional defeats, while we realise Elena's family try to search for a glimpse of hope.

Cast

Accolades

|-
| align = "center" rowspan = "18" | 2009 || rowspan = "15" | 23rd Goya Awards
| colspan = "2" | Best Film ||  || rowspan = "15" | 
|-
| Best Director || José Luis Cuerda || 
|-
| Best Adapted Screenplay || Rafael Azcona & José Luis Cuerda || 
|-
| Best Original Score || Lucio Godoy || 
|-
| Best Actor || Raúl Arévalo || 
|-
| Best Actress || Maribel Verdú || 
|-
| Best Supporting Actor || José Ángel Egido || 
|-
| Best New Actor || Martiño Rivas || 
|-
| Best Production Supervision || Emiliano Otegui || 
|-
| Best Cinematography || Hans Burmann || 
|-
| Best Editing || Nacho Ruiz Capillas || 
|-
| Best Art Direction || Balter Gallart || 
|-
| Best Costume Design || Sonia Grande || 
|-
| Best Makeup and Hairstyles || Fermín Galán & Sylvie Imbert || 
|-
| Best Sound || Alfonso Raposo, María Sternberg & Ricardo Steinberg || 
|-
| rowspan = "3" | 18th Actors and Actresses Union Awards || Best Film Actress in a Leading Role || Maribel Verdú ||  || rowspan = "3" | 
|-
| Best Film Actor in a Leading Role || Raúl Arévalo || 
|-
| Best Film Actor in a Minor Role || José Ángel Egido || 
|}

See also
 List of Spanish films of 2008
 List of Spanish submissions for the Academy Award for Best International Feature Film
 List of submissions to the 81st Academy Awards for Best Foreign Language Film
 The Endless Trench, another Spanish film about a man hiding in his home after the war.

References

External links
 
 

2008 films
2000s Spanish-language films
2000s war drama films
Spanish war drama films
Films with screenplays by Rafael Azcona
2008 drama films
Films set in the 1940s
Films set in Galicia (Spain)
2000s Spanish films
Films directed by José Luis Cuerda